The Women's 49er FX was a sailing event on the Sailing at the 2016 Summer Olympics program in Rio de Janeiro and took place from 12 to 18 August at Marina da Glória. Thirteen races (the last one a medal race) were held.

The medals were presented by Barbara Kendall, IOC member, New Zealand and Carlo Croce, President of World Sailing.

Schedule

Results

References 

Women's 49erFX
49er FX
Women's events at the 2016 Summer Olympics
Olym